Philip Johnston may refer to:
 Philip Johnston (New Jersey soldier) (died 1776), colonel of the New Jersey militia who died at the Battle of Long Island
 Philip Johnston (code talker) (1892–1978), proposed the idea of using the Navajo language as a code in World War II
 Phillip Johnston (born 1955), American avant-garde jazz saxophonist
 Philip W. Johnston (born 1944), Massachusetts politician
 Philip Johnston (estate agent) (1966-2017), estate agent from Belfast, Northern Ireland
 Philip Mainwaring Johnston (1865–1936), British architect and architectural historian
 Phil Johnston (footballer) (born 1990), Scottish footballer

See also
Phillip Johnson (disambiguation)